Helga Hellebrand-Wiedermann (29 December 1930 – 8 February 2013) was an Austrian sprint canoeist who competed in the late 1950s and early 1960s. Competing in two Summer Olympics, she earned her best finish of ninth in the K-2 500 m event at Rome in 1960.

References

Mention of Helga Hellebrand-Wiedermann's death (pg. 28) 

1930 births
2013 deaths
Austrian female canoeists
Canoeists at the 1956 Summer Olympics
Canoeists at the 1960 Summer Olympics
Olympic canoeists of Austria